Pisuviricota is a phylum of RNA viruses that includes all positive-strand and double-stranded RNA viruses that infect eukaryotes and are not members of the phylum Kitrinoviricota, Lenarviricota or Duplornaviricota. The name of the group is a syllabic abbreviation of “picornavirus supergroup” with the suffix -viricota, indicating a virus phylum. Phylogenetic analyses suggest that Birnaviridae and Permutotetraviridae, both currently unassigned to a phylum in Orthornavirae, also belong to this phylum and that both are sister groups. Another proposed family of the phylum is unassigned Polymycoviridae in Riboviria.

Classes

The following classes are recognized:

 Duplopiviricetes
 Pisoniviricetes
 Stelpaviricetes

References

Viruses